Kannard Johnson (born June 24, 1965) is an American retired college and professional basketball player.  He was selected by the National Basketball Association's Cleveland Cavaliers with the 41st overall pick (second round) of the 1987 NBA draft.

Born and raised in Cincinnati, Johnson, played college basketball at Western Kentucky University.  At Western Kentucky, Johnson was a key player in the resurgence of the basketball program.  He was a four-year starter and led the team to its first Sun Belt Conference basketball championship, a top ten national ranking, a 2nd-place finish in the pre-season NIT, and back-to-back NCAA tournament appearances.

Johnson appeared in four games with the Cavaliers in the 1987–88 NBA season. He scored 2 points with a 33% field goal percentage in the 12 minutes he played.

References

External links
basketpedya.com
 Johnson bio from basketball-reference.com

1965 births
Living people
AEK B.C. players
African-American basketball players
American expatriate basketball people in Germany
American expatriate basketball people in Greece
American expatriate basketball people in Italy
American men's basketball players
Basketball players from Cincinnati
Bayer Giants Leverkusen players
Cleveland Cavaliers draft picks
Cleveland Cavaliers players
Connecticut Pride players
Greek Basket League players
Pallacanestro Reggiana players
Power forwards (basketball)
Rockford Lightning players
Sioux Falls Skyforce (CBA) players
Small forwards
Western Kentucky Hilltoppers basketball players
Yakima Sun Kings players
21st-century African-American people
20th-century African-American sportspeople